Milan Šrejber (born 30 December 1963) is a former tennis player from Czechoslovakia, who represented his native country at the 1988 Summer Olympics in Seoul. There he reached the semi finals of the men's doubles competition, partnering Miloslav Mečíř. The pair was defeated by America's eventual winners Ken Flach and Robert Seguso, but still won the bronze medal. The right-hander won one career singles title (Rye Brook, 1988), and reached his highest ATP singles ranking of World No. 23 in October 1986.

His best Grand Slam singles result came at 1986 US Open, where he reached the quarterfinals by defeating Jimmy Arias, Broderick Dyke, Jaime Yzaga and Todd Witsken, before losing to Boris Becker in straight sets. 

Some of his best performances was in Davis Cup where he beat Andrei Cherkasov, Jakob Hlasek, Marc Rosset, Carl-Uwe Steeb, Mats Wilander
and Alexander Volkov .

Career finals

Singles: 2 (1 win, 1 loss)

External links
 
 

1963 births
Living people
Czech male tennis players
Czechoslovak male tennis players
Olympic bronze medalists for Czechoslovakia
Olympic tennis players of Czechoslovakia
Tennis players from Prague
Tennis players at the 1988 Summer Olympics
Olympic medalists in tennis
Medalists at the 1988 Summer Olympics